Cristiceps aurantiacus (golden weedfish or yellow crested weedfish) is a species of clinid found around New South Wales, Australia and New Zealand. Its diet consists of crustaceans and small fishes. It can reach a length of  TL.

References

External links
 Photograph

aurantiacus
Taxa named by François-Louis Laporte, comte de Castelnau
Fish described in 1879